The 2003 Norwegian Football Cup Final was the final match of the 2003 Norwegian Football Cup, the 98th season of the Norwegian Football Cup, the premier Norwegian football cup competition organized by the Football Association of Norway (NFF). The match was played on 9 November 2003 at the Ullevaal Stadion in Oslo, and opposed two Tippeligaen sides Bodø/Glimt and Rosenborg. Rosenborg defeated Bodø/Glimt 3–1 after extra time to claim the Norwegian Cup for a ninth time in their history.

Route to the final

Match

Details

References 

2003
Rosenborg BK matches
FK Bodø/Glimt matches
Football Cup
Sports competitions in Oslo
November 2003 sports events in Europe
2000s in Oslo